Chaudhry Muhammad Ali (Urdu, ; 15 July 1905 – 2 December 1982), best known as Muhammad Ali, was a Pakistani politician and statesman who served as the fourth prime minister of Pakistan, appointed on 12 August 1955. His government transitioned Pakistan from an independent British Dominion to a Republic. He resigned from the position of Prime Minister, and from the Muslim League as well, when he failed at healing rifts with Muslim League, and a new party, named as Republican Party.

His credibility is noted for promulgating the first set of the Constitution of Pakistan lost political endorsement from his party when failing to investigate the allegations on vote rigging and the secret defections in favor of the Republican Party.

Biography
Muhammad Ali was born in Jullundar, Punjab in India on 15 July 1905 in Arain family. 

After his matriculation, Muhammad Ali showed great aptitude for science, first moving to attend the Punjab University in Lahore where he read and graduated with BSc degree in Chemistry in 1925. In 1927, Muhammad Ali attained MSc in Chemistry from Punjab University, and lectured at the Islamia College until 1928.

In 1928, Muhammad Ali went to join the Indian Civil Service, first working as an accountant at the Audit and Accounts Service and was deputed to audit the Bahawalpur state. In 1936, Muhammad Ali was moved as Private Secretary to James Grigg, the Finance Minister of India, who later appointed him as the First Indian financial adviser when Grigg was appointed as the War Secretary in 1945. In 1946–47, Muhammad Ali was selected to serve as one of two secretaries to the Partition Council presided over by Lord Mountbatten, later appointed as Finance Secretary at the Ministry of Finance. Over this issue of partition, Muhammad Ali worked with H.M. Patel and Walter Christir to prepare a document titled The Administrative Consequences of Partition.

At the time of the India's partition in 1947, Muhammad Ali opted for Pakistan.

After the establishment of Pakistan in 1947, Muhammad Ali was moved as the Finance Secretary under Finance Minister Sir Ghulam Muhammad, along with Victor Turner, but this appointment lasted until 1948 due a cabinet reshuffle. He was appointed as the Federal Secretary at the Establishment Division, and aided greatly in setting up the civil bureaucracy and preparing the nation's first federal budget presented by Finance Minister Sir Ghulam Muhammad in 1951.

Prime Minister of Pakistan
In 1951, Muhammad Ali was appointed as the Finance Minister by Prime Minister K. Nazimuddin and was announced to be kept in the Finance ministry in Bogra's Talent ministry in 1953.

On 11 August 1955, Muhammad Ali was appointed as the Prime Minister of Pakistan by then-Governor-General Iskandar Mirza, upon the dismissal of the Bogra's Talent administration. After taking oath from the Chief Justice M. Munir, Prime Minister Ali placed a great emphasis on drafting of the Constitution of Pakistan, and supported Bogra's One Unit scheme despite the opposition.

He favored French architect Michel Ecochard over Greek architect Constantinos Doxiadis over the planning of new capital in 1955, though the project nonetheless went Doxiadis in 1960s.

It was during his term when the first set of the Constitution of Pakistan was promulgated on 23 March 1956 where the nation-state was declared as Islamic republic with a parliamentary form. His premiership was endorsed by President Iskandar Mirza and the three-party coalition government composing of Awami League, Muslim League and the Republican Party at the National Assembly. In 1955, Prime Minister Ali took over the party presidency.

In July 1956, Muhammad Ali met with the Indian Prime Minister Jawahar Lal Nehru of India in an attempt to settle the key issue that was preventing the normalization of relations between Pakistan and India. This was the issue of Kashmir that had been divided between India and Pakistan in 1948. That issue remains unsettled to this day.

Despite his feat, Prime Minister Muhammad Ali proved to be a poor politician who failed to maintain control over his party when he reached a compromise to dismissed the cabinet members of his own party in favor of appointing the cabinet composing of Republican Party and Awami League in 1955–56. After appointing Abdul Jabbar Khan as the Chief minister of West-Pakistan who subsequently helped in secret trading in favor of Republican Party that made the Republicans in majority in the National Assembly, the Muslim League demanded its president to investigate the matter but Prime Minister Ali refused to support the parliamentary resolution in the National Assembly by believing that "he was responsible only to the Cabinet and the Parliament, not the party."

On 8 September 1956, the parliamentary leaders of the Muslim League under A.Q. Khan, successfully brought the motion of no confidence at the National Assembly that effectively removed him from the party's presidency. Despite support from President Mirza, Prime Minister Ali eventually resigned when Huseyn S. Suhrawardy gained support from the Muslim League for the premiership.

After his resignation, Ali joined the National Bank as an advisor. He tried playing a role in national politics in the 1960s, but was ostracized by the Muslim League due to his political role played in 1950s.

His son, Khalid Anwer, is a well-known lawyer and constitutional expert, who served as the Law and Justice minister in Sharif's administrations while his younger son is Dr. Amjad Ahsan Ali is well known medical doctor. In 1967, he wrote his memoirs and died due to a cardiac arrest on 2 December 1982 in estate in Karachi where he was buried.

See also
 Parliamentary history of Pakistan
 Central coalition government of Pakistan (1954-58)

References

External links
 Chronicles Of Pakistan

|-

|-

1905 births
1980 deaths
British special advisers
Finance Ministers of Pakistan
Finance Secretaries of Pakistan
Academic staff of the Government Islamia College
Members of the Pakistan Philosophical Congress
Pakistan Movement activists from Punjab
Pakistan Muslim League politicians
Pakistani civil servants
Pakistani democracy activists
Pakistani chemists
Pakistani economists
Pakistani financiers
Pakistani memoirists
People from Jalandhar
People from Karachi
People from Lahore
Politicians from Punjab, Pakistan
Prime Ministers of Pakistan
Punjabi people
University of the Punjab alumni
20th-century memoirists
20th-century British businesspeople